Huling Ulan sa Tag-Araw is a 2021 Philippine romantic comedy drama film directed by Louie Ignacio under Heaven's Best Entertainment. It stars Rita Daniela and Ken Chan.

Synopsis
Luis (Ken Chan), a seminarian, was given a leave to give him time to ponder whether he wants to become a priest. In his first night out, he encounters Luisa (Rita Daniela), a singer and sex worker, and unintentionally disrupted her transaction with a client. To compensate, Luis pays her money in exchange of going with him to his parents' house in Pagsanjan. There, the two develop feelings for each other.

Cast
Ken Chan as Luis
Rita Daniela as Luisa
Lotlot de Leon as Luis' mother
Richard Yap as Luis' father

Production
Huling Ulan sa Tag-Araw was produced under Heaven's Best Entertainment with Louie Ignacio as director. Filming took around eight to nine days in Pagsanjan, Laguna. Huling Ulan sa Tag-Araw marks the film debut for Rita Daniela and Ken Chan as a love team.

Release
Huling Ulan sa Tag-Araw will premiere on December 25, 2021, in the Philippines as one of the official entries of the 2021 Metro Manila Film Festival.

References

Philippine romantic comedy-drama films
Films shot in Laguna (province)
Films set in Laguna (province)
2021 romantic comedy-drama films